Henri Lafont (born Henri Chamberlin, 22 April 1902 – 26 December 1944) was a French criminal based in Paris who headed the French Gestapo during the Nazi German occupation in World War II.

He was executed by firing squad on 26 December 1944 alongside corrupt policeman Pierre Bonny and footballer-turned-criminal Alexandre Villaplane.

See also
Carlingue
Georges Delfanne
Rudy de Mérode
Auguste Ricord
Milice

References
Magazine Historia Hors Série n°26 1972 by Fabrice Laroche
La Bande Bonny-Lafont ed. Fleuve noir, 1992 by Serge Jacquemard, 
Les comtesses de la Gestapo ed. Grasset, 2007 by Cyril Eder, 
The King of Nazi Paris by Christopher Othen, Biteback, 2020,

External links
Unofficial site on Patrick Modiano
On "les malfrats de la Carlingue"

1902 births
1944 deaths
Criminals from Paris
French collaborators with Nazi Germany
Nazi collaborators shot at the Fort de Montrouge
Gestapo personnel
French police officers convicted of crimes
Executed people from Île-de-France
Filmed executions